The Cape Horn Biosphere Reserve (Cabo de Hornos Biosphere Reserve) is located in the extreme south of Chile and comprises marine areas, islands, fjords, channels, forests and moorland. All biosphere reserves include core zones (no significant infrastructure development), buffer zones (light development) and transition zones (more traditional development under a sustainable rubric). In the case of Cape Horn Biosphere Reserve, the core zone is constituted of Alberto de Agostini National Park and Cabo de Hornos National Park, which are strictly protected under Chilean law and under the biosphere reserve status cannot have infrastructure for lodging.

The Cape Horn Biosphere Reserve is administered by a Governing Board that is presided by the regional governor and includes relevant public services and local organizations. The reserve's scientific advisory board is coordinated by the Omora Ethnobotanical Park - University of Magallanes. In addition to hosting the world's southernmost forested ecosystems and culture (the Yahgans), the Cape Horn Archipelago also protects 5% of the world's bryophyte diversity (mosses and liverworts). While considered one of the world's last remaining wilderness areas, Cape Horn currently is confronting serious threats related to tourism, development of real estate projects, invasive exotic species and salmon farming.

See also
 List of environment topics
 World Network of Biosphere Reserves

References

 Rozzi, R., F. Massardo, C.B. Anderson, A. Berghoefer, A. Mansilla, M. Mansilla and J. Plana (2006). Reserva de Biosfera Cabo de Hornos. Ediciones de la Universidad de Magallanes. Punta Arenas, Chile. 258 pp.
 Mittermeier, R. A., C. Mittermeier, P. Robles-Gil, J. Pilgrim, G. Fonseca, T. Brook, and W. Konstant. 2002. Wilderness: Earth's last wild places. CEMEX–Conservation International, Washington, D.C., USA.

External links
 UNESCO Biosphere Page
 Omora Ethnobotanical Park
 UNT Chile Program Office
 Omora Sub-Antarctic Research Alliance

Biosphere reserves of Chile
Protected areas of Magallanes Region
Tierra del Fuego